Meridolum corneovirens, also known as the Cumberland Plain Land Snail, is a species of air-breathing land snail, terrestrial pulmonate gastropod mollusk in the family Camaenidae. This species is endemic to Australia. While little is known about the feeding habits of M. corneovirens, it appears to have a broad dietary range with a preference for fungi; it has also been reported as feeding on dead conspecifics.

References

External links 
 photo

corneovirens
Endangered fauna of Australia
Gastropods described in 1851
Taxonomy articles created by Polbot